is a district of Tokyo, Japan, located in Chiyoda Ward.  It is the location of the Diet of Japan and the Prime Minister's residence (Kantei). The Supreme Court of Japan is located in neighboring Hayabusachō. Nagatachō is often used to refer to the elected Japanese government, while  Kasumigaseki   refers to the unelected bureaucratic administration.

During the Edo period, the area surrounding Hibiya High School and Embassy of Mexico was samurai residences of Kishiwada Domain.

Companies based in Nagatachō

NTT DoCoMo has its headquarters in the Sanno Park Tower in Nagatachō.

The Swiss House, the Japanese offices of Swiss International Air Lines, are located in the Sanno Park Tower Annex.

Prudential Financial has its Japanese offices in Prudential Tower in Tokyo. A number of foreign firms have their Japanese offices in Nagatachō, including Baker & McKenzie, Citibank, and Dow Jones.

Surrounding area

National Diet Library
Cabinet Office
Headquarters of the Liberal Democratic Party (Japan)
Hie Shrine
Hibiya High School
The Capitol Hotel Tokyu
Akasaka Excel Hotel Tokyu
Tokyo Imperial Palace - located in neighboring Nagatachō
Kajima - in Moto-Akasaka
Suntory - in Akasaka
Tokyo Broadcasting System (TBS) - in Akasaka
Komatsu Limited - in Akasaka

Subway stations
Akasaka-mitsuke Station (Ginza Line, Marunouchi Line)
Kokkai-gijidō-mae Station (Chiyoda Line, Marunouchi Line)
Nagatachō Station (Hanzōmon Line, Namboku Line, Yūrakuchō Line)
Tameike-Sannō Station (Ginza Line, Namboku Line)

Education
 operates public elementary and junior high schools. Kōjimachi Elementary School (麹町小学校) is the zoned elementary of Nagatcho 1-2 chōme. Kōjimachi Elementary was formed from the merger of the former Kōjimachi Elementary and Nagatachō Elementary School (永田町小学校). It began holding classes, in the year 2000, at the former Nagatachō Elementary facility. Its current building opened on April 1, 2003.

There is a freedom of choice system for junior high schools in Chiyoda Ward, and so there are no specific junior high school attendance zones.

See also

Sannō Matsuri
Rosanjin
February 26 Incident
New Sanno Hotel

References

Districts of Chiyoda, Tokyo